The Sound of Perseverance is the seventh and final studio album by American death metal band Death, released on August 31, 1998, by Nuclear Blast. The album features a whole new lineup of members except Chuck Schuldiner; it is the only album to feature guitarist Shannon Hamm, drummer Richard Christy, and bassist Scott Clendenin. It is also Death's final commercial release as in 2001 founding member, lead singer and primary songwriter Chuck Schuldiner would die due to brain cancer-related issues and subsequently Death disbanded.

Overview 
It was a breakthrough album for drummer and later radio star Richard Christy, in the tradition of previous drummers like Gene Hoglan and Sean Reinert. The album features "Voice of the Soul", an instrumental track that contrasts with almost every other work of the band in its inclusion of softer guitars and lack of percussion. In an interview done in March 1999, Chuck Schuldiner stated that the acoustic guitar-driven "Voice of the Soul" was actually written during the Symbolic sessions. Death has produced only two instrumentals (the other being the more electric guitar driven "Cosmic Sea" from Human). The album also featured a cover of Judas Priest's "Painkiller", which shows Schuldiner attempting a different, high-pitched style of death growl more reminiscent of Rob Halford's original vocals and also singing for the first time with a clean voice through the end of the song. All the solos in the song are rewritten.

Some of the song names and music on The Sound of Perseverance were originally going to appear on the first Control Denied album, The Fragile Art of Existence (1999). Schuldiner himself denied this in an interview with Metal Maniacs in 1998 by saying that none of his compositions for Control Denied had been used to fill space for a Death album. Schuldiner implied that some Control Denied songs were used for The Sound of Perseverance in an interview with Scream Magazine in October 1999, when he stated that The Fragile Art of Existence "contains a lot of music I didn't have in mind originally. Most of the material was completed in 1996-97." Also, Tim Aymar, in December 2010, confirmed that a few of the Control Denied songs had been, in his words, "'Deathized' and recorded on TSOP." When Death was signed on to Nuclear Blast, Schuldiner agreed to make one last Death album before moving forward with Control Denied.

"Spirit Crusher" is the only single from the album. It features a music video that was taken from the band's 2001 live album Live in Eindhoven.

Deluxe editions
Nuclear Blast released a deluxe edition in December 2005. It contains the original album as well as the DVD Live in Cottbus '98 and press pictures. It was also released as a DualDisc.

Relapse Records released a second deluxe edition on February 15, 2011. The album was remastered and reissued in deluxe 2-CD and 3-CD formats, with the additional CDs containing unreleased demo material and a revised cover by original cover artist Travis Smith.

Reception 

The Sound of Perseverance has received critical acclaim and is considered by fans and critics alike as one of Death's greatest albums. Jason Hundey of AllMusic described it as "a truly glorious metal release, certainly Death's finest hour, and easily one of the top metal albums of all time". Chronicles of Chaos reviewer Paul Schwarz said the album "excels in all the right places. Great thrashings, technical solos, memorable choruses and clear vocals are the order of the day".

Track listing

Personnel

Death 
 Chuck Schuldiner - vocals, lead and rhythm guitar
 Shannon Hamm - lead guitar
 Scott Clendenin - bass
 Richard Christy - drums

Additional personnel 
 Steve Di Giorgio – bass on 1997 and 1998 demos
 Chris Williams – drums on 1996 demo
 Paul Payne – vocals on 1996 demo
 Shannon Hamm – vocals on 1996 demo

Production 
 Chuck Schuldinerproducer
 Jim Morrisproducer, engineer, mixing, mastering
 Travis Smithartwork
 Jay Speisart direction, graphic design
 Eric GreifLegal & IP management
 Alex McKnightphotography

Charts

References 

1998 albums
Death (metal band) albums
Nuclear Blast albums
Relapse Records albums
Albums recorded at Morrisound Recording
Albums with cover art by Travis Smith (artist)